The list of ship decommissionings in 1988 includes a chronological list of all ships decommissioned in 1988.


See also 

1988
 
Ship